William Stuart "Nobby" Clark (born ) is a New Zealand politician, serving as the Mayor of Invercargill since 2022. He has also served on the Invercargill City Council since 2019 and as deputy mayor since 2020.

Early life and career
Clark was born in Nelson and moved to Auckland after leaving school. He served as a medic during the Vietnam War, and subsequently moved to Invercargill in 1975. He has been described as a blue collar worker and worked at Oranga Tamariki, Stopping Violence Southland, and the IHC New Zealand.

He was employed by Idea Services the company owned by IHC, until he was sacked as their Southland regional manager. He initially lost a wrongful dismissal case, but on appeal won $15,500 compensation and repayment of costs.

Political career
Prior to being elected to council in 2019, Clark was spokesman of the Invercargill Ratepayers Advocacy Group. He was the highest polling Invercargill city council candidate in 2019, with 10,802 votes. He was selected by mayor Tim Shadbolt to be deputy mayor on 12 October 2020, following the resignation of Toni Biddle. Following clashes with Shadbolt, Clark announced his intention to resign as deputy in March 2022, but was eventually convinced to stay on.

2022 Invercargill mayoral election
On 30 May 2022, Clark announced his candidacy for the 2022 Invercargill mayoral election. In June, he announced the formation of a group of ten council candidates he would run alongside. The group mostly consists of new candidates, though incumbent councillor Allan Arnold was among them. This ticket was revealed in July to be called "Let's Go Invercargill".

On 8 October, Clark won the Invercargill mayoral election, winning 6,537 votes. The incumbent Shadbolt only won 847 votes while the second-highest candidate Newstalk ZB broadcaster Marcus Lush won 3,785 votes.

Mayor of Invercargill, 2022–present
Following his election as Mayor, Clark announced that he would focus on opposing the Government's Three Waters reform programme, building a new museum in Invercargill and reviewing project spending. He also detailed plans to cut $50 million from the city's $115 million budget. He stated that he would not wear the mayoral robes and would not be addressed as "Your Worship" as his predecessor had. On 14 October, he appointed newly-elected councillor Tom Campbell as his deputy. 

On 1 November, Clark attempted to remove the speaking rights of mana whenua representatives at full council meetings, as they did not have voting rights. This proposal was defeated in a council vote.

Clark made national headlines in March 2023 for his use of the word nigger in a speech at an arts event, and again while defending his actions to the media. He argued that he was questioning the line between artistic expression and hate speech in response to a controversial poem by Tusiata Avia. Race Relations Commissioner Meng Foon called on him to apologise and Green Party co-leader Marama Davidson called on him to resign. Clark responded by calling for Foon to resign instead, for not investigating Avia for alleged hate speech.

Personal life

Clark has the distinction of being the first person to run the Kepler track 30 times. In 2004 he became just the fourth person to donate a kidney anonymously in New Zealand.

References

1950s births
Living people
People from Nelson, New Zealand
Invercargill City Councillors
Deputy mayors of Invercargill
Mayors of Invercargill